Eliezer Mayenda Dossou (born 8 May 2005) is a Spanish professional footballer who plays as a forward for Ligue 2 club Sochaux.

Club career 
Mayenda was born in Zaragoza in Spain. In November 2017, while playing for the youth teams of CS Brétigny, he agreed to join Sochaux. He made his professional debut for the club in a Coupe de France match against Nantes on 18 December 2021, coming on as a substitute at the 86th minute. After a 0–0 draw in regulation time, Nantes won 5–4 in a penalty shoot-out. By making the appearance, Mayenda became the youngest player to play in an official senior match for Sochaux at the age of 16 years, 7 months, and 10 days.

On 29 January 2022, Mayenda made his debut for Sochaux's reserves in the Championnat National 3, coming on as a late substitute in a 3–1 win over Grandvillars. On 2 February, he signed his first professional contract.

International career 
Mayenda was born in Zaragoza, Spain. On 4 February 2022, Mayenda was called up to the Spain under-17s for the Torneio Internacional Algarve U17, a youth tournament held in Portugal.

References

External links 

 
 

2005 births
Living people
Footballers from Zaragoza
Spanish footballers
Association football forwards
CD Ebro players
FC Sochaux-Montbéliard players
Ligue 2 players
Championnat National 3 players
Spanish expatriate footballers
Expatriate footballers in France
Spanish expatriate sportspeople in France
Spanish sportspeople of African descent
Spanish people of Democratic Republic of the Congo descent
Spanish people of Beninese descent